State of Emergency is the third extended play by American rapper Lil Tjay. It was released on May 8, 2020 by Columbia Records. The album features guest appearances from Fivio Foreign, Pop Smoke, Sheff G, Sleepy Hallow, J.I the Prince of N.Y, and Jay Gwuapo.

Promotion 
"Ice Cold" was released on May 1, 2020 as the lead single, alongside a music video.

The music video for "Zoo York" featuring Pop Smoke and Fivio Foreign was released on May 8, 2020.

Critical reception 
Pitchfork assigns 6.7/10 and says: "Across a mostly fun, guest-filled 22 minutes, the young New York rapper does what needs to be done and puts on for his city". It also explains how the name of the EP has nothing to do with the COVID-19 pandemic, but with the murder problems caused in New York. However he adds that the album created in too short a time and that 22 minutes are not enough to give a completely positive review.

Track listing 
Track listing and credits adapted from Spotify.

Charts

References 

2020 EPs
Lil Tjay albums
Columbia Records albums